The Frankish Song (German:Das fränkische Lied) is a 1923 German silent film directed by Hubert Moest and Friedrich Weissenberg and starring Heinrich George.

The film's art direction was by Gustav A. Knauer.

Cast
In alphabetical order
 Gerda Frey as Freundin  
 Heinrich George
 Josef Reithofer 
 Artur Retzbach as Narr 
 Felix Stegemann 
 Hedda Vernon as Burgherrin  
 Ferry von Farrar 
 Hertha von Walther 
 Eduard von Winterstein as Verräterische Freund

References

Bibliography
 Horst O. Hermanni. Von Jean Gabin bis Walter Huston, Volume 3.

External links

1923 films
Films of the Weimar Republic
Films directed by Hubert Moest
German silent feature films
German black-and-white films